In the history of Panama, the earliest known inhabitants were the Cueva and Coclé tribes, but they were drastically reduced by disease and fighting when the Spanish arrived in the 16th century. But some moved out of Panama to have children and increase population.

Rodrigo de Bastidas, sailing westward from Venezuela in 1501 in search of gold, was the first European to explore the Isthmus of Panama. 10 years later, Vasco Núñez de Balboa visited the Isthmus and established a short-lived settlement in the Darién. Vasco Núñez de Balboa's torturous trek from the Atlantic to the Pacific in 1513 demonstrated that the Isthmus was, indeed, the path between the seas, and Panama quickly became the crossroads and marketplace of Spain's empire in the New World. Gold and silver were brought by ship from South America, hauled across the Isthmus, and loaded aboard ships for Spain. The route became known as the Camino Real de Portobelo, or Royal Road of Portobelo, although it was more commonly known as Camino Real de Cruces (Royal Road of the Crosses) because the road led to the TOWN of Venta Cruces located on the Rio Chagres.

Panama was part of the Spanish empire for nearly 300 years, from 1538 to 1821. From the outset, Panamanian identity was based on a sense of "geographic destiny", and Panamanian fortunes fluctuated with the geopolitical importance of the Isthmus. The colonial experience also spawned Panamanian nationalism as well as a racially complex and highly stratified society, the source of internal conflicts that ran counter to the unifying force of nationalism.

Indigenous Panama

Estimates vary greatly of the number of Indians who inhabited the isthmus when the Spanish explorers arrived. By some accounts, the population was considerably greater than that of contemporary Panama. Some Panamanian historians have suggested that there might have been a population of 500,000 Indians from some sixty "tribes", but other researchers have concluded that the Cuna alone numbered some 750,000.

Besides the Cuna, which constituted by far the largest group in the area, two other major groups, the Guaymí and the Chocó, have been identified by ethnologists. The Guaymí, of the highlands near the Costa Rican border, are believed to be related to Indians of the Nahuatlan and Mayan nations of Mexico and Central America. The Chocó on the Pacific side of Darién Province appear to be related to the Chibcha of Colombia.

Although the Cuna, now found mostly in the Comarca de San Blas, an indigenous territory or reserve considered part of Colón Province for some official purposes, have been categorized as belonging to the Caribbean culture, their origin continues to be a subject of speculation. Various ethnologists have indicated the possibility of a linguistic connection between the name Cuna and certain Arawak and Carib tribal names. The possibility of cultural links with the Andean Indians has been postulated, and some scholars have noted linguistic and other affinities with the Chibcha. The implication in terms of settlement patterns is that the great valleys of Colombia, which trend toward the isthmus, determined migration in that direction.

Lines of affiliation have also been traced to the Cueva and Coiba tribes, although some anthropologists suggest that the Cuna might belong to a largely extinct linguistic group. Some Cuna believe themselves to be of Carib stock, while others trace their origin to creation by the god Olokkuppilele at Mount Tacarcuna, west of the mouth of the Río Atrato in Colombia.

Among all three Indian groups — the Cuna, Guaymí, and Chocó — land was communally owned and farmed. In addition to hunting and fishing, the Indians raised corn, cotton, cacao, various root crops and other vegetables, and fruits. They lived then — as many still do — in circular thatched huts and slept in hammocks. Villages specialized in producing certain goods, and traders moved among them along the rivers and coastal waters in dugout canoes. The Indians were skillful potters, stonecutters, goldsmiths, and silversmiths. The ornaments they wore, including breastplates and earrings of beaten gold, reinforced the Spanish myth of El Dorado, the city of gold.

The conquest
Rodrigo de Bastidas, a wealthy notary public from Seville, was the first of many Spanish explorers to reach the isthmus. Sailing westward from Venezuela in 1501 in search of gold, he explored some 150 kilometers of the coastal area before heading for the West Indies. A year later, Christopher Columbus, on his fourth voyage to the New World, touched several points on the isthmus. One was a horseshoe-shaped harbor that he named Puerto Bello (beautiful port), later renamed Portobelo.

Vasco Núñez de Balboa, a member of Bastidas' crew, had settled in Hispaniola (present-day Dominican Republic and Haiti) but stowed away on a voyage to Panama in 1510 to escape his creditors. At that time, about 800 Spaniards lived on the isthmus, but soon the many jungle perils, doubtless including malaria and yellow fever, had killed all but 60 of them. Finally, the settlers at Antigua del Darién (Antigua), the first city to be duly constituted by the Spanish crown, deposed the crown's representative and elected Balboa and Martin Zamudio co-mayors.

Balboa proved to be a good administrator. He insisted that the settlers plant crops rather than depend solely on supply ships, and Antigua became a prosperous community. Like other conquistadors, Balboa led raids on Indian settlements, but unlike most, he proceeded to befriend the conquered tribes. He took the daughter of a chief as his lifelong mistress.

On September 1, 1513, Balboa set out with 190 Spaniards — among them Francisco Pizarro, who later conquered the Inca Empire in Peru — a pack of dogs, and 1,000 Indian slaves. After twenty-five days of hacking their way through the jungle, the party gazed on the vast expanse of the Pacific Ocean. Balboa, clad in full armor, waded into the water and claimed the sea and all the shores on which it washed for his God and his king.

Balboa returned to Antigua in January 1514 with all 190 soldiers and with cotton cloth, pearls, and 40,000 pesos in gold. Meanwhile, Balboa's enemies had denounced him in the Spanish court, and King Ferdinand appointed a new governor for the colony, then known as Castilla de Oro. The new governor, Pedro Arias de Avila, who became known as "Pedrarias the Cruel", charged Balboa with treason. In 1517 Balboa was arrested, brought to the court of Pedrarias, and executed.

In 1519 Pedrarias moved his capital away from the debilitating climate and unfriendly Indians of the Darién to a fishing village on the Pacific coast (about four kilometers east of the present-day capital). The Indians called the village Panama, meaning "plenty of fish." In the same year, Nombre de Dios, a deserted early settlement, was resettled and until the end of the 16th century served as the Caribbean port for trans-isthmian traffic. A trail known as the Camino Real, or royal road, linked Panama and Nombre de Dios. Along this trail, traces of which can still be followed, gold from Peru was carried by muleback to Spanish galleons waiting on the Atlantic coast.

The increasing importance of the isthmus for transporting treasure and the delay and difficulties posed by the Camino Real inspired surveys ordered by the Spanish crown in the 1520s and 1530s to ascertain the feasibility of constructing a canal. The idea was finally abandoned in mid-century by King Philip II (1556–98), who concluded that if God had wanted a canal there, He would have built one.

Pedrarias' governorship proved to be disastrous. Hundreds of Spaniards died of disease and starvation in their brocaded silk clothing; thousands of Indians were robbed, enslaved, and massacred. Thousands more of the Indians succumbed to European diseases to which they had no natural immunity. After the atrocities of Pedrarias, most of the Indians fled to remote areas to avoid the Spaniards.

The regulations for colonial administration set forth by the Spanish king's Council of the Indies decreed that the Indians were to be protected and converted to Christianity. The colonies, however, were far from the seat of ultimate responsibility, and few administrators were guided by the humane spirit of those regulations. The Roman Catholic Church, and particularly the Franciscan order, showed some concern for the welfare of the Indians, but on the whole, church efforts were inadequate to the situation.

The Indians, nevertheless, found one effective benefactor among their Spanish oppressors. Bartolomé de las Casas, the first priest ordained in the West Indies, was outraged by the persecution of the Indians. He freed his own slaves, returned to Spain, and persuaded the council to adopt stronger measures against enslaving the Indians. He made one suggestion that he later regretted—that Africans, whom the Spaniards considered less than human, be imported to replace the Indians as slaves.

In 1517 King Charles V (1516–56) granted a concession for exporting 4,000 African slaves to the Antilles. Thus the slave trade began and flourished for more than 200 years. Panama was a major distribution point for slaves headed elsewhere on the mainland. The supply of Indian labor had been depleted by the mid-16th century, however, and Panama began to absorb many of the slaves. A large number of slaves on the isthmus escaped into the jungle. They became known as cimarrones, meaning wild or unruly, because they attacked travelers along the Camino Real. An official census of Panama City in 1610 listed 548 citizens, 303 women, 156 children, 146 mulattoes, 148 Antillean blacks, and 3,500 African slaves.

The Spanish colony
The period of free, though licensed, exploration gave way to a period in which the king exercised royal control by appointing governors and their staffs. All were to be paid from crown revenues expected from the royal profits on the colony. The king's representative was responsible for ensuring such returns; he tracked all gold, pearls, and income from trade and conquest; he weighed out and safeguarded the king's share.

Governors had some summary powers of justice, but audiencias  (courts) were also established. The first such audiencia, in Santo Domingo, Hispaniola, had jurisdiction over the whole area of conquest. As settlement spread, other audiencias were set up. By a decree of 1538, all Spanish territory from Nicaragua to Cape Horn was to be administered from an audiencia in Panama. This audiencia lasted only until 1543 because of the impossibility of exercising jurisdiction over so vast an area. A new Panamanian audiencia, with jurisdiction over an area more nearly coinciding with the territory of present-day Panama, was established in 1563. The viceroy's position was revived for the rich empires of Mexico and Peru. After 1567 Panama was attached to the Viceroyalty of Peru but retained its own audiencia.

Beginning early in the 16th century, Nombre de Dios in Panama, Vera Cruz in Mexico, and Cartagena in Colombia were the only three ports in Spanish America authorized by the crown to trade with the homeland. By the mid-1560s, the system became regularized, and two fleets sailed annually from Spain, one to Mexico, and the other to southern ports. These fleets would then rendezvous at Havana and return together to Cádiz, Spain. In principle, this rigid system remained in effect until the 18th century. From the middle of the 17th century, however, as the strength and prosperity of Spain declined, annual visits became the exception.

Shipments of bullion and goods were to be delivered to Panama on the Pacific side for transport over the isthmus and return to Spain. Panama's own contribution to the loading of the fleet was relatively small. Gold production was never great, and little exportable surplus of agricultural and forest products was available. Nothing was manufactured; in fact, Spain discouraged the production of finished goods. The colony's prosperity, therefore, fluctuated with the volume of trade, made up largely of Peruvian shipments. When the Inca gold was exhausted, great quantities of silver mined in Peru replaced gold in trade for 150 years, supplemented eventually by sugar, cotton, wine, indigo, cinchona, vanilla, and cacao.

Spain had banned Indian slavery, so the colonists started importing African slaves. By 1565, there were 7 African slaves for every European. Many African slaves ran away and joined up with escaped Indian slaves and remnants of the local Indian population. A slave called Felipillo founded a village of Africans and Indians in the mangroves of the Gulf of San Miguel that lasted two years before being wiped out in 1551. Escaped slaves, or maroons, soon outnumbered the European population and they defeated Spanish expeditions against them in 1554 and 1555.

Except for traffic in African slaves, foreign trade was forbidden unless the goods passed through Spain. Africans were brought to the colonies on contract (asiento) by Portuguese, English, Dutch, and French slavers, who were forbidden to trade in any other commodities. Spanish efforts to retain their monopoly on the rich profits from trade with their colonies provided a challenge to the rising maritime nations of Europe. Intermittent maritime warfare resulted in the Caribbean and later in the Pacific. The first serious interference with trade came from the English.

From 1572 to 1597, Francis Drake was associated with most of the assaults on Panama. Drake's activities demonstrated the indefensibility of the open roadstead of Nombre de Dios. In 1597 the Atlantic terminus of the trans-isthmian route was moved to Portobelo, one of the best natural harbors anywhere on the Spanish Main (the mainland of Spanish America). Drake allied with the Cimarron people, the local population based around escaped slaves.

Seventeenth Century
Despite raids on shipments and ports, the registered legal import of precious metals increased threefold between 1550 and 1600. Panama's prosperity was at its peak during the first part of the 17th century. This was the time of the famous ferias (fairs, or exchange markets) of Portobelo, where European merchandise could be purchased to supply the commerce of the whole west coast south of Nicaragua. When a feria ended, Portobelo would revert to its quiet existence as a small seaport and garrison town.

Panama City also flourished on the profits of trade. Following reconstruction after a serious fire in 1644, contemporary accounts credit Panama City with 1,400 residences "of all types" (probably including slave huts); most business places, religious houses, and substantial residences were rebuilt of stone. Panama City was considered, after Mexico City and Lima, the most beautiful and opulent settlement in the West Indies.

Interest in a canal project was revived early in the 17th century by Philip III of Spain (1598–1621). The Council of the Indies dissuaded the king, arguing that a canal would draw attack from other European nations—an indication of the decline of Spanish sea power.

During the first quarter of the 17th century, trade between Spain and the isthmus remained undisturbed. At the same time, England, France, and the Netherlands, one or all almost constantly at war with Spain, began seizing colonies in the Caribbean. Such footholds in the West Indies encouraged the development of the buccaneers—English, French, Dutch, and Portuguese adventurers who preyed on Spanish shipping and ports with the tacit or open support of their governments. Because of their numbers and the closeness of their bases, the buccaneers were more effective against Spanish trade than the English had been during the previous century.

The volume of registered precious metal arriving in Spain fell from its peak in 1600; by 1660 volume was less than the amount registered a century before. Depletion of Peruvian mines, an increase in smuggling, and the buccaneers were causes of the decline.

Henry Morgan, a buccaneer who had held Portobelo for ransom in 1668, returned to Panama with a stronger force at the end of 1670. On January 29, 1671, Morgan appeared at Panama City. With 1,400 men he defeated the garrison of 2,600 in pitched battle outside the city, which he then looted. The officials and citizens fled, some to the country and others to Peru, having loaded their ships with the most important church and government funds and treasure. Panama City was destroyed by fire, probably from blown up powder stores, although the looters were blamed. After 4 weeks, Morgan left with 175 mule loads of loot and 600 prisoners. Two years later, a new city was founded at the location of the present-day capital and was heavily fortified.

The buccaneer scourge rapidly declined after 1688 mainly because of changing European alliances. By this time Spain was chronically bankrupt; its population had fallen; and it suffered internal government mismanagement and corruption.

Influenced by buccaneer reports about the ease with which the isthmus could be crossed—which suggested the possibility of digging a canal—William Paterson, founder and ex-governor of the Bank of England, organized a Scottish company to establish a colony in the San Blas area. Paterson landed on the Caribbean coast of the Darién late in 1698 with about 1,200 persons. Although well received by the Indians (as was anyone not Spanish), the colonists were poorly prepared for life in the tropics with its attendant diseases. Their notion of trade goods—European clothing, wigs, and English Bibles—was of little interest to the Indians. These colonists gave up after six months, unknowingly passing at sea reinforcements totaling another 1,600 people. The Spanish reacted to these new arrivals by establishing a blockade from the sea. The English capitulated and left in April 1700, having lost many lives, mostly from malnutrition and disease.

Eighteenth century
In Spain, Bourbon kings replaced the Habsburgs in 1700, and some liberalization of trade was introduced. These measures were too late for Panama, however. Spain's desperate efforts to maintain its colonial trade monopoly had been self-defeating. Cheaper goods supplied by England, France, and the Netherlands were welcomed by colonial officials and private traders alike. Dealing in contraband increased to the detriment of official trade. Fewer merchants came to the Portobelo feria to pay Spain's inflated prices because the foreign suppliers furnished cheaper goods at any port at which they could slip by or bribe the coastal guards. The situation worsened; only five of the previously annual fleets were dispatched to Latin America between 1715 and 1736, a circumstance that increased contraband operations.

Panama's temporary loss of its independent audiencia, from 1718 to 1722, and the country's attachment to the Viceroyalty of Peru were probably engineered by powerful Peruvian merchants. They resented the venality of Panamanian officials and their ineffectiveness in suppressing the pirates (outlaws of no flag, as distinct from the buccaneers of the 17th century). Panama's weakness was further shown by its inability to protect itself against an invasion by the Miskito Indians of Nicaragua, who attacked from Laguna de Chiriquí. Another Indian uprising in the valley of the Río Tuira caused the whites to abandon the Darién.

The final blow to Panama's shrinking control of the transit trade between Latin America and Spain came before the mid-18th century. As a provision of the Treaty of Utrecht at the end of the War of the Spanish Succession in 1713, Britain secured the right to supply African slaves to the Spanish colonies (4,800 a year for 30 years) and also to send 1 ship a year to Portobelo. The slave trade provision evidently satisfied both countries, but the trade in goods did not. Smuggling by British ships continued, and a highly organized contraband trade based in Jamaica—with the collusion of Panamanian merchants—nearly wiped out the legal trade. By 1739 the importance of the isthmus to Spain had seriously declined; Spain again suppressed Panama's autonomy by making the region part of the Viceroyalty of New Granada (encompassing present-day Colombia, Venezuela, Ecuador, and Panama).

In the same year, war broke out between Britain and Spain. A British military force took Portobelo and destroyed it. Panamanian historians maintain that this attack diverted Spanish trade from the trans-isthmian route. The Seville–Cádiz monopoly of colonial trade had been breached by royal decrees earlier in the century, and precedent was thus furnished for the merchants of the Latin American colonies to agitate for direct trade with Spain and for intercolonial trade. After 1740 the Pacific coast ports were permitted to trade directly via ships rounding Cape Horn, and the Portobelo feria was never held again.

Relaxing the trading laws benefited both Spanish America and Spain, but Panama's economic decline was serious. Transit trade had for so long furnished the profits on which Panama had flourished that there had been no incentive to develop any other economic base. After the suppression of its audiencia in 1751, Panama became a quiet backwater, a geographically isolated appendage of New Granada, scarcely self-supporting even in food and producing little for export.

In 1793, near the close of the colonial period, the first recorded attempt at a comprehensive census of the area that had comprised the Panamanian audiencia was made. Incomplete and doubtless omitting most of the Indian and cimarrón population, specifically excluding soldiers and priests, the census recorded 71,888 inhabitants, 7,857 of whom lived in Panama City. Other principal towns had populations ranging from 2,000 to a little over 5,000.

Social hierarchy in the colony was rigid. The most prestigious and rewarding positions were reserved for the peninsulares , those actually born in Spain. Criollos, those of Spanish ancestry but born in the colonies, occupied secondary posts in government and trade. Mestizos, usually offspring of Hispanic fathers and Indian mothers, engaged in farming, retail trade, and the provision of services. African and Indian slaves constituted an underclass. To the extent possible, Indians who escaped enslavement avoided Hispanic society altogether.

The church held a special place in society. Priests accompanied every expedition and were always counselors to the temporal leaders. The first bishop on the mainland came with Pedrarias. The bishop's authority, received from the king, made him in effect a vice governor. The bishopric was moved from Darién to Panama City in 1521. The relationship between church and government in the colony was closer than in Spain. Both the Roman Catholic Church and the monastic orders gained great wealth through tithes and land acquisition.

Independence from Spain
Lacking communication except by sea, which the Spanish generally controlled, Panama remained aloof from the early efforts of the Spanish colonies to separate from Spain. Revolutionaries of other colonies, however, did not hesitate to use Panama's strategic potential as a pawn in revolutionary maneuvers. General Francisco de Miranda of Venezuela, who had been attracting support for revolutionary activities as early as 1797, offered a canal concession to Britain in return for aid. Thomas Jefferson, while minister to France, also showed interest in a canal, but the isolationist policies of the new United States and the absorption of energies and capital in continental expansion prevented serious consideration.

Patriots from Cartagena attempted to take Portobelo in 1814 and again in 1819, and a naval effort from liberated Chile succeeded in capturing the island of Taboga in the Bay of Panama. Panama's first act of separation from Spain came without violence. When Simón Bolívar's victory at Boyacá on August 7, 1819, clinched the liberation of New Granada, the Spanish viceroy fled Colombia for Panama, where he ruled harshly until his death in 1821. His replacement in Panama, a liberal constitutionalist, permitted a free press and the formation of patriotic associations. Raising troops locally, he soon sailed for Ecuador, leaving a native Panamanian, Colonel José de Fábrega, as acting governor.

Panama City immediately initiated plans to declare independence, but the city of Los Santos preempted the move by proclaiming freedom from Spain on November 10, 1821. This act precipitated a meeting in Panama City on November 28, which is celebrated as the official date of independence.

References

Notes

Works cited
Black, Jan Knippers and Edmundo Flores. "Historical Setting". A Country Study: Panama. Library of Congress Federal Research Division (December 1987). 

History of Panama by period